Giselbert I of Bergamo (died c.927/929) was a northern Italian nobleman.

Life
Giselbert I's parents are unknown. He is the progenitor of the dynasty known to historians as the Giselbertiners (or Giselbertini).

Giselbert I was originally a vassal of Berengar I of Italy. Yet by 922 he supported Rudolph II of Burgundy, who rewarded him with the position of count of Bergamo (923).

When Rudolf fell from favour, Giselbert I changed allegiances once again. By 926 he was invested as count palatine of Bergamo by the new king, Hugh of Italy.

Marriage and children
Giselbert I married Rotruda of Pavia, daughter of Walpert of Pavia, c.895. Their son was Lanfranc I of Bergamo.

Notes

References
F. Menant, ‘Les Giselbertins, comtes du comté de Bergame et comtes palatins,’ in Formazione e strutture dei ceti dominanti nel medioevo (1988), pp. 115–186.
J. Jarnut, Bergamo 568-1098. Verfassungs-, Sozial- und Wirtschaftsgeschichte einer lombardischen Stadt im Mittelalter (Wiesbaden, 1977). 
E. Hlawitschka, Franken, Alemannen, Bayern und Burgunder in Oberitalien, 774-962: Zum Verständnis der fränkischen Königsherrschaft in Italien (Freiburg im Breisgau, 1960), accessible online at: Genealogie Mittelalter
Jean Baptiste David. Manuel de l'histoire de Belgique Vanlinthout, (1853) p. 171 et seq. (in French)

People from Bergamo
9th-century Italian nobility
10th-century Italian nobility